Jelovec ( or) is a settlement immediately west of Sodražica in southern Slovenia. The entire Municipality of Sodražica is part of the traditional region of Lower Carniola and is included in the Southeast Slovenia Statistical Region.

References

External links
Jelovec on Geopedia

Populated places in the Municipality of Sodražica